The Rural Municipality of Reno No. 51 is a rural municipality (RM) in the Canadian province of Saskatchewan within Census Division No. 4 and  Division No. 3. Located in the southwest corner of the province, it is adjacent to the United States border to the south and the Alberta boundary to the west.

History 
The RM of Reno No. 51 incorporated as a rural municipality on December 11, 1911. Reno, Nevada and Reno County, Kansas are both named for Jesse Lee Reno, a Union general in the American Civil War. However, no record exists of why the Saskatchewan RM's name might derive from this source. An alternative explanation is that RENO is an acronym of four rural post offices in the vicinity - Russthorn (near Robsart), Eden Valley (southwest of Cypress Lake), Nashlyn (south of Consul), and Oxarat (west of Cypress Lake). Although Nashlyn then lay outside the boundary of the RM, similar acronymic names are not unknown on the Canadian prairies; see also Sangudo, Alberta.

Geography 
The RM of Reno No. 51 is in the southwest corner of the province. It neighbours Hill County and Blaine County in Montana to the south and Cypress County in Alberta to the west. Within Saskatchewan, it is adjacent to the RMs of Maple Creek No. 111, White Valley No. 49, and Frontier No. 19.

Communities and localities 
The following urban municipalities are surrounded by the RM.

Villages
Consul

The following unincorporated communities are located in the RM.

Localities
Altwan
Battle Creek
Govenlock, dissolved as a village January 1, 1976
Merryflat
Nashlyn
Notukeu
Oxarat
Palisade
Rangeview
Robsart, dissolved as a village January 1, 2002
Senate, dissolved as a village January 1, 1994
Supreme
Tyro
Vidora, dissolved as a village January 1, 1952
West Plains
Willow Creek

Climate

Demographics 

Attractions and parks 
 Red Coat Trail
 Robsart Art Works
 Old Man on His Back Prairie and Heritage Conservation Area
 Cypress Lake Recreation Site
 Heglund Island Wildlife Refuge

Govenlock-Nashlyn-Battle Creek Grasslands IBA 
Govenlock-Nashlyn-Battle Creek Grasslands (SK 039) is an Important Bird Area (IBA) of Canada located at the south-western corner of the RM of Reno. It is a rectangular-shaped IBA site with the southern boundary running along the border with Montana. The western boundary runs up for  along the border with Alberta and the northern boundary extends towards the communities of Govenlock and Nashlyn and Battle Creek. From Nashlyn, it heads straight south back to the U.S. border. The site totals  and has an elevation range of 903 to 1,001 metres. Access is from Highway 21.

The landscape of Govenlock-Nashlyn-Battle Creek Grasslands consists of large expanses of native grassland and rugged valleys with steep cliffs and cut banks. Originating from the Cypress Hills to the north, several of the streams that run through the site have been dammed to provide water for cattle. McRae, Lodge, and Middle Creeks are the primary waterways through the site while Battle Creek skirts the north-eastern edge. A variety of birds are found in the IBA, including the sage grouse, prairie falcon, golden eagle, ferruginous hawk, violet-green swallow, burrowing owl, rock wren, short-eared owl, sage thrasher, rough-legged hawk, long-billed curlew, Sprague's pipit, Baird's sparrow, Brewer's sparrow, chestnut-collared longspur, McCown's longspur, and the Bullock's oriole. The creeks and dams also provide important habit for fawning and wintering pronghorn.

Government 
The RM of Reno No. 51 is governed by an elected municipal council and an appointed administrator that meets on the second Wednesday of every month. The reeve of the RM is Brian McMillan while its administrator is Tanya Howell. The RM's office is located in Consul.

Transportation 
The following is a list of Saskatchewan highways, railways, and other forms of transportation that service the area.
Highway 13
Highway 18
Highway 21
Highway 615
Highway 271
Great Western Railway – a Canadian short line railway company operating on former Canadian Pacific Railway trackage in southwest Saskatchewan

See also 
List of rural municipalities in Saskatchewan

References 

Reno
Division No. 4, Saskatchewan
Important Bird Areas of Saskatchewan